Egg roast is a dish native to Kerala, India, consisting of eggs roasted in a masala gravy.  It is commonly consumed as an accompaniment mainly with appam and puttu or less often with chapattis (Indian flat bread) or porotas (typical all flour flat bread which is popular in Kerala, Tamil Nadu and Sri Lanka) or it is also used (least often) with steamed rice.

Kerala cuisine
Egg dishes